Centers of Biomedical Research Excellence (COBRE) support centers that help expand and develop institutional biomedical research capacity by enhancing research infrastructure. This includes the establishment of core facilities needed to carry out the objectives of the COBRE program.  COBREs are expected to improve through peer reviewed efforts and project grant support. COBRE is a division of the National Center for Research Resources, which is itself part of the National Institutes of Health.

Each COBRE includes:
 a principal investigator, who is an established biomedical or behavioral research scientist
 three to five individual research projects
 at least one mentor.

External links
 COBRE Homepage

Medical research institutes in the United States
National Institutes of Health